Menegroth is a black metal band from Switzerland founded in 2001 in Zurich.
They play melodic black metal with lyrical influences from the art of Futurism (Marinetti), War, Gnosticism, Alchemy (inspired by Julius Evola) and the 'Style of Fascism' (Armin Mohler). 
The name comes from J. R. R. Tolkien's The Silmarillion, where Menegroth is a subterranean dwelling place of the Elves. On the album 'Gazourmah', Josef Maria Klumb (Von Thronstahl) speaks words at the song 'Mithras Initiation'.
In July 2012 they did release an album about a mix of futurism and alchemy in a coat of Russian communism.

Discography

Demos
 2001: Legend Of The Nordic Man (demo tape)
 2005: Kriegsmobilmachung (demo tape)

Albums
 2004: Helvetische Urgewalt (CD)
 2007: s/t (LP)
 2008: Menegroth/Freitod Split (MLP)
 2009: Gazourmah (CD)
 2010: s/t Rerelease with Bonus (CD)
 2012: Das rote Werk (CD)

Compilations
Menegroth has contributed another version of the song 'Zang Tumb Tumb' to 'Parole In Libertà' a tribute album for Filippo Tommaso Marinetti, a demo version of 'Imperium Solaris Luzifer' for the 'No Mercy For Democracy' black metal compilation tape and the song 'Mithras Initiation (UR Version)' for the Julius Evola tribute album 'The Spirit Of Europe'.

External links

Reviews
german review by Blaue Narzisse
german review for the album 'Gazourmah'
german review for s/t LP
Gazourmah at 'Darker Than Black'
german review for the new red work album at Ablaze Magazin

Miscellaneous links
Menegroth entry at Discogs

Swiss black metal musical groups
Avant-garde metal musical groups
Musical groups established in 2001